is the second single by Japanese entertainer Miho Nakayama. Written by Takashi Matsumoto and Kyōhei Tsutsumi, the single was released on October 1, 1985, by King Records.

Background and release
"Namaiki" was written by Matsumoto as a tale of heartbreak, depicting a girl travelling to a foreign country to heal from her emotional wounds.

"Namaiki" peaked at No. 8 on Oricon's weekly singles chart and sold over 114,000 copies, becoming Nakayama's first top-10 hit.

Track listing

Charts

References

External links

1985 singles
1985 songs
Japanese-language songs
Miho Nakayama songs
Songs with lyrics by Takashi Matsumoto (lyricist)
Songs with music by Kyōhei Tsutsumi
King Records (Japan) singles